Rugrats is a 1991 animated television series.

Rugrat(s) may also refer to:

Nickelodeon franchise 
Rugrats (2021 TV series), a reboot of the 1991 series
Rugrats (film series)
Rugrats (comic strip)
Rugrats (franchise)

Other uses 
 Rugrat, a slang term for toddler
 The Rugrats (band), a rock band